Gareth is a Welsh masculine given name. The name's popularity in Wales may be as a hypocorism of Geraint, which itself became popular after the famous hero and king of Dumnonia.

The modern name appears in Le Morte d'Arthur by Thomas Malory, in which it belonged to Sir Gareth, a brother of Sir Gawain and one of the Knights of the Round Table. Malory either based the name on Gahariet (a name found in French Arthurian texts) or on the Welsh language word gwaredd, meaning "gentleness".

People

 Gareth Abraham (born 1969), Welsh former footballer
 Gareth Bale (born 1989), Welsh footballer
 Gareth Barry (born 1981), English footballer
 Gareth Branwyn (born 1958), American writer and editor
 Gareth Brooks (born 1979), New Zealand field hockey player
 Gareth Chilcott (born 1956), English retired rugby union player
 Gareth Cooper (born 1979), Welsh retired rugby union player
 Gareth David (stage name Gareth Campesinos), lead singer of the English-Welsh indie pop band Los Campesinos!
 Gareth David-Lloyd (born 1981), Welsh actor
 Gareth Davies (disambiguation)
 Gareth Dean (born 1981), Welsh rugby league player
 Gareth Edwards (disambiguation)
 Gareth Ellis (born 1981), English rugby league player
 Gareth Emery (born 1980), British trance-genre producer and DJ
 Gareth Evans (disambiguation)
 Gareth Frodsham (born 1989), English rugby league player
 Gareth Gates (born 1984), English singer-songwriter
 Gareth Griffiths (disambiguation)
 Gareth Hale (born 1953), English comedian and actor
 Gareth Higgins, writer from Northern Ireland
 Gareth Hopkins (born 1976), New Zealand cricketer
 Gareth Hopkins (footballer) (born 1980), English footballer
 Gareth Hughes (1894-1965), Welsh actor
 Gareth Hughes (politician) (born 1981), New Zealand politician
 Gareth Hunt, stage name of English actor Alan Leonard Hunt (1942-2007)
 Gareth Johnson (born 1969), British politician
 Gareth Johnson (hurler), Irish hurler
 Gareth Jones (disambiguation)
 Gareth Koch (born 1962), Australian classical guitarist
 Gareth Krause (born 1981), South African rugby union player
 Gareth Llewellyn (born 1969), Welsh rugby union player
 Gareth Malone (born 1975), British choirmaster and broadcaster
 Gareth Maule (born 1987), Welsh rugby union player
 Gareth McAuley (born 1979), Northern Irish footballer
 Gareth McGrillen (born 1981), Australian bass guitar player, record producer and DJ
 Gareth McLean (born c. 1975), Scottish journalist
 Gareth Mitchell (born 1970), Welsh journalist and lecturer
 Gareth Morgan (disambiguation)
 Gareth Naven (born 1969), Australian soccer manager and former player
 Gareth Owen (disambiguation)
 Gareth Peirce (born 1940), female English solicitor and human rights activist
 Gareth Philips, British television producer
 Gareth Pierce, Welsh actor
 Gareth Price (born 1980), Welsh rugby league player
 Gareth Price (rugby league) (1917-1992), Welsh rugby league player and coach
 Gareth Rees (disambiguation)
 Gareth Reynolds (born 1979), American-British comedian, producer, writer, and podcaster 
 Gareth Roberts (disambiguation)
 Gareth Russell (author), British author
 Gareth Russell (musician), bass guitarist for Idlewild
 Gareth Southgate (born 1970), English football manager and former player
 Gareth Snell (born 1986),  English Member of Parliament
 Gareth Steenson (born 1984), rugby union player from Northern Ireland
 Gareth Thomas (disambiguation)
 Gareth Unwin (born 1972), British film producer
 Gareth Ward, Australian politician 
 Gareth Williams (disambiguation)
 Gareth Wood (born 1995), British acrobatic gymnast

Fictional characters
 Gareth Blackstock, title character of the British television sitcom Chef!
 Gareth Keenan, a regular character from The Office
 Gareth Mallory, current M, James Bond's boss
 Gareth Lewis (Doctors), from the British soap opera Doctors
 Gareth Regan, from the British soap opera Doctors
 Gareth (The Walking Dead), from the American television show The Walking Dead
 Gareth, from Galavant
Gareth Worrall (Actor)

See also
Garath (disambiguation)
Garry (disambiguation)
Gary (disambiguation)
Garaidh

References

Welsh masculine given names